During the 1996–97 English football season, West Ham United competed in the FA Premier League.

Season summary
The season began with much excitement at Upton Park, as a whole host of foreign signings arrived. However, most of the acquisitions were short-lived and unsuccessful. Romanian striker Florin Răducioiu walked out in mid-season after scoring just two goals and Portuguese winger Paulo Futre played just nine games for the club before giving in to a knee injury and announcing his retirement in November.

It was a season of struggle for Harry Redknapp's team, but in the end a new wave of players helped to keep West Ham in the Premiership. Exciting young defender Rio Ferdinand broke into the side, while newly signed strikers Paul Kitson and John Hartson gave the attack the boost that Răducioiu and Futre had failed to deliver.

With survival confirmed by the final day of the season, there was now talk of pushing for a UEFA Cup place in the following campaign.

Final league table

Results summary

Results by matchday

Results
West Ham United's score comes first

Legend

FA Premier League

FA Cup

League Cup

First-team squad

Left club during season

Statistics

Starting 11
Considering starts in all competitions
 GK: Luděk Mikloško
 RB: Tim Breacker
 CB: Marc Rieper
 CB: Slaven Bilić
 CB: Julian Dicks
 LB: Mark Bowen
 CM: Michael Hughes
 CM: Ian Bishop
 CM: John Moncur
 CF: Iain Dowie
 CF: Paul Kitson

References

West Ham United F.C. seasons
West Ham United
West Ham United
West Ham United